Audaz (P-45) is an offshore patrol vessel and the fifth of the Meteoro class created for the Spanish Navy. It is the fourth Navy ship to carry this name. The patrol vessel was built in the Navantia's shipyard in San Fernando.

Order and construction
On May 7, 2014, SEPI announced that it had approved the construction of two new units, one to be built at the Cadiz shipyard in San Fernando / Puerto Real and the other at Ferrol. The first sheet metal cut for these vessels, was carried out simultaneously in the shipyards of the bay of Cadiz and those of the Ferrol estuary on December 5, 2014. Order No. DEF/1564/2015 was published in the Official State Gazette on June 26, 2015, which names of these two ships as Audaz (P-45) and Furor (P-46).

The ship was laid down on April 29, 2016 and launched on March 30, 2017 at the San Fernando shipyard. The operational tests were done between the 15 and 21 of May 2018. The ship was commissioned on July 27, 2018.

Operational history 
The Audaz was assigned to the Naval Base of Cartagena where it arrived on September 2018.

It first mission was assigned on 20 August 2019. It consisted of heading to the island of Lampedusa, Italy to escort the Open Arms vessel to the port of Mahon, Spain after italian interior minister, Matteo Salvini, denied the ship's entry to the country.

References

Ships of the Spanish Navy
Buque de Acción Marítima
Ships built in Spain
2017 ships